Naum Varlaamovich Terebinsky (variant of the patronymic name — Varlamovich; ; 1 December 1851 — after 1908) was a student of the theological seminary, a doctor of medicine, a deputy Orenburg City Duma, a deputy of the Third Imperial Duma from the Orenburg Governorate from 1907 to 1908. His son was Nikolai Naumovich Terebinsky (1880—1959), a professor, one of the pioneers of open heart surgery.

Literature 
 Теребинский Наум Варлаамович (in Russian) // Государственная дума Российской империи: 1906—1917 / Б. Ю. Иванов, А. А. Комзолова, И. С. Ряховская. — Москва: РОССПЭН, 2008. — P. 608. — 735 p. — .
 Теребинскій (in Russian) // Члены Государственной Думы (портреты и биографии). Третий созыв. 1907—1912 гг. / Сост. М. М. Боиович. — Москва, 1913. — P. 210. — 526 p. (in Russian)
 Сафонов Д. А. Теребинский, Наум Варламович (in Russian) // Башкирская энциклопедия. — Уфа: ГАУН «Башкирская энциклопедия», 2013. — .

1851 births
Year of death missing
People from Orenburg Governorate
Octobrists
Members of the 3rd State Duma of the Russian Empire